Laura Herin Ávila (born 8 April 2001) is a Cuban wrestler. She competed in the women's freestyle 53 kg event at the 2020 Summer Olympics held in Tokyo, Japan. She lost her first match against Pang Qianyu of China and she was then eliminated in the repechage by Jacarra Winchester of the United States. A few months later, she won the gold medal in the women's 53 kg event at the 2021 Junior Pan American Games held in Cali, Colombia.

She competed in the 53kg event at the 2022 World Wrestling Championships held in Belgrade, Serbia.

Notes

References

External links
 

2001 births
Living people
Cuban female sport wrestlers
Olympic wrestlers of Cuba
Wrestlers at the 2020 Summer Olympics
Place of birth missing (living people)
21st-century Cuban women